The British Normandy Memorial is a war memorial near the village of Ver-sur-Mer in Normandy, France.  It was unveiled on 6 June 2021, the 77th anniversary of D-Day, and it is dedicated to soldiers who died under British command during the Normandy landings.

The memorial records the names of 22,442 people from more than 30 countries under British command who were killed in Normandy from 6 June to 31 August 1944 .

Background 
The Normandy landings began just after midnight on 6 June 1944, with a glider assault to capture the Caen canal and Orne river bridges.

US forces began landings on Utah and Omaha Beaches at about 06:30.  About an hour later, due do different tide conditions along the coast, British and Canadian forces landed on Gold, Juno and Sword Beaches, from Port-en-Bessin in the west to Ouistreham in the east.  Ver-sur-Mer lies at the eastern end of King Sector of Gold Beach, near its border with the west edge of Juno Beach, on the road inland from the landing site around La Rivière to Crépon.

Establishment 
In July 2015, George Batts, a veteran of the Normandy landings, met with BBC journalist Nicholas Witchell.  Batts pointed out that the United Kingdom was the only major Allied nation without a dedicated memorial in Normandy.  The Normandy Memorial Trust was set up after their meeting.

About 18 hectares of land for the memorial was acquired on a hill to the west of Ver-sur-Mer overlooking Gold Beach, and permission for the memorial sought from French authorities in 2017 and 2018.  The site was formally inaugurated by British Prime Minister Theresa May and French President Emmanuel Macron on 6 June 2019, the 75th anniversary of D-Day, after the installation of David Williams-Ellis's D-Day Sculpture.

Construction was performed from 2019 to 2020 by the French company Eiffage-Route.  The stonework was made by the stonemasons S. McConnell and Sons at their works in Kilkeel, County Down, Northern Ireland, using 4,000 tons of French limestone from Massangis.

Design and symbolism 
The memorial was designed by British architect Liam O'Connor, who previously designed the British Armed Forces Memorial at the National Memorial Arboretum in Staffordshire, and also the RAF Bomber Command Memorial in London.  Long crossing paths of the memorial create a plan that resembles the Union Flag.

The centrepiece of the memorial is a bronze sculpture by David Williams-Ellis, with larger than life size statues of three soldiers coming ashore during the landings.

The names of 1,746 people killed on D-Day, 6 June 1944, are inscribed on the D-Day Wall of the central memorial court, constructed around Williams-Ellis's sculpture. The dead on succeeding days are inscribed on 160 white columns of the cloister court in chronological order of death clockwise around the Memorial Court, up to 31 August (shortly after the closure of the Falaise Gap on 21 August and the liberation of Paris on 25 August, and just before the Supreme Headquarters Allied Expeditionary Force moved from London to Versailles and Dwight D. Eisenhower took direct command of Allied forces in Western Europe). The names are arranged on each day by service branch, including RAF personnel killed on supporting missions, and special forces and agents operating behind German lines, including members of the SAS and SOE.  The roll of honour was compiled by professional historians, Jane Furlong and Andrew Whitmarsh.

The site includes a memorial dedicated to the 20,000 French civilians killed during the war in Normandy. 

In a field adjacent to the memorial are the remains of the Mont Fleury German battery of  coastal guns that remained uncompleted on D-Day, with only one captured Soviet 122 mm gun M1931 (A-19) gun installed but not yet operational.  The village of Ver-sur-Mer has a French war memorial, separate memorials to the Royal Artillery regiments of the 50th (Northumbrian) Infantry Division and to the 2nd battalion of the Hertfordshire Regiment, and a preserved Sexton self-propelled 25-pounder gun. A small memorial to CSM Stan Hollis of the Green Howards, the Stan Hollis Hut, stands by the beach near where he landed on 6 June 1944.

Reception 
During planning some local residents expressed concern over an increase in tourism and environmental degradation to the area. The reaction of visitors and local residents since the memorial was completed has been very positive.

Maintenance 
The British Normandy Memorial is maintained in partnership with the Commonwealth War Graves Commission. As noted above, the construction of the memorial was supported by the British Government. Ongoing maintenance of the memorial and its landscape is funded through voluntary contributions.

See also 
 List of military cemeteries in Normandy

References

Notes

Citations

External links 

 

British military memorials and cemeteries
2021 establishments in France
2021 establishments in the United Kingdom
World War II memorials in France
Bronze sculptures in France
2021 sculptures
Sculptures of men in France
Death in Normandy
Statues in France